This is a list of years in Spain.

16th century

17th century

18th century

19th century

20th century

21st century

See also
 Timeline of Spanish history

 
Spain history-related lists
Spain